Hydroxydione, as hydroxydione sodium succinate (brand names Viadril, Predion, and Presuren), also known as 21-Hydroxy-5β-pregnane-3,20-dione, is a neuroactive steroid which was formerly used as a general anesthetic, but was discontinued due to incidence of thrombophlebitis in patients. It was introduced in 1957, and was the first neuroactive steroid general anesthetic to be introduced for clinical use, an event which was shortly preceded by the observation in 1954 of the sedative properties of progesterone in mice.

Chemistry

Related compounds include alfadolone, alfaxolone, dihydrodeoxycorticosterone, ganaxolone, minaxolone, pregnanolone, and renanolone.

References

5β-Pregnanes
Primary alcohols
Diketones
GABAA receptor positive allosteric modulators
General anesthetics
Neurosteroids